One Sydney Harbour is a skyscraper complex under construction in Sydney, New South Wales, Australia. It includes 808 apartments in three towers, and is being built by Lendlease. The three towers are 247 metres (72 floors), 230m (68), and 104m (29) tall respectively. The project is part of the major urban renewal precinct of Barangaroo, which also includes International Towers Sydney and Crown Sydney. The project was first proposed as an early concept in 2013, before Renzo Piano's design entry was appointed as the final design in 2015. Approval was given to the two towers in 2017, with construction commencing in 2019.

Construction

See also 

 List of tallest buildings in Sydney

References 

Proposed buildings and structures in Sydney